Antonio Marzano (born 18 February 1935) is an Italian economist, academic and politician, who served as the minister of productive activities in the second cabinet of Silvio Berlusconi from 2001 to 2005.

Early life and education
Marzano was born in Rome on 18 February 1935. He holds a law degree.

Career
Marzano is an economist by profession. He worked at Abruzzi University from 1968 to 1971. He has been professor of economic and financial politics at the University of Rome since 1974 and professor of economic policy at the LUISS University of Rome since 1978. He is a member of the Forza Italia. He was the economic advisor to Silvio Berlusconi in the 1990s. In 1996, he became a member of the Italian Parliament. 

He was appointed minister of productive activities to the cabinet led by Prime Minister Berlusconi in 2001. The same year he was again elected to the Parliament. Claudio Scajola replaced him minister of productive activities on 23 April 2005. Then Marzano became a member of the CNEL (National Council for Economics and Labour). His tenure in the parliament ended in 2005. On 22 July 2005 he was appointed president of the CNEL and served in the post until 2010.

In 2009 Marzano was named as the president of International Association of Economic and Social Councils and Similar Institutions (AICESIS) and became its honorary president in 2011. He is a member of the Italy-USA Foundation.

Work
Marzano is the author of nearly 150 books most of which focus on economics and finance.

Awards and honors
Marzano is the recipient of various awards and honors, including Grand Officer of the Order of Merit of the Italian Republic.

References

External links

21st-century Italian writers
1935 births
Deputies of Legislature XIII of Italy
Deputies of Legislature XIV of Italy
Forza Italia politicians
Government ministers of Italy
Grand Officers of the Order of Merit of the Italian Republic
Italian economists
Leaders of organizations
Living people
Politicians from Rome
Academic staff of the Sapienza University of Rome
Academic staff of the Libera Università Internazionale degli Studi Sociali Guido Carli